FREP is a database of mouse repeat sequences derived from cDNAs

See also 
 Repeated sequence (DNA)

References

External links 
 https://web.archive.org/web/20080430084627/http://facts.gsc.riken.go.jp/FREP/

Biological databases
 
Mouse genetics